Quill is a painting and animation software for virtual reality. It runs on Microsoft Windows with Oculus Rift headsets. It's used to create 3D paintings and animated cartoons.

Quill was released on November 29, 2016 on the Oculus Store. Quill Theater, an application for viewing creations made in Quill, was later made available following the release of the Oculus Quest.

In September 2021, Facebook, now known as Meta Platforms, and the owner of Oculus, sold Quill to its original creator, who continues to develop and support the app.

Development 
Quill was originally developed by Oculus Story Studio as an internal tool for the creative needs of the studio's project Dear Angelica directed by Saschka Unseld along with its art-director Wesley Allsbrook.

Controls 
The software works on Oculus Rift utilizing its 6DoF motion controllers. Users can paint in 3D space using their hands naturally, and animate those paintings with keyframes. They can also capture videos and photos of their creations.

Reception 
Dear Angelica, a VR story fully painted in Quill, was nominated for an Emmy Award in 2017.

References 

Graphics software
2016 software
Oculus Rift